Faran Haroon Tahir (born February 16, 1963) is a Pakistani-American actor. 

Tahir was born in Los Angeles to an artistic family. His parents were actor Naeem Tahir and radio host Yasmeen Tahir and his grandparents were writers Imtiaz Ali Taj and Hijab Imtiaz Ali. Tahir went on to graduate from theatre programs at the University of California, Berkeley and the Institute for Advanced Theater Training at Harvard University. 

Tahir made his television debut as a desk clerk on Midnight Caller in 1989. He made his film debut as Nathoo in Disney's 1994 live-action version of The Jungle Book. He has gone on to star in a variety of roles, such as Raza in Iron Man (2008), Captain Robau in Star Trek (2009), and President Patel in Elysium (2013). In 2016, he played the titular role of Othello in a production by the Shakespeare Theatre Company in Washington, D.C.

Early life
Faran Haroon Tahir was born on 16 February 1963 in Los Angeles to Naeem Tahir, a veteran actor and respected writer, and Yasmeen Tahir. Through his mother, "one of the most famous voices of Radio Pakistan", his grandparents are famous writers Imtiaz Ali Taj and Hijab Imtiaz Ali, also the first ever Muslim female pilot, while his younger brother Ali Tahir (b. 1972) is an actor as well, better known for starring in the comedy-drama sitcom Teen Bata Teen. His other younger brother, Mehran Tahir (b. 1965), is a TV producer, who has for instance worked for Hum TV. Faran Tahir grew up in Pakistan and returned to the United States in 1980. 

Tahir studied business economics at the University of California, Berkeley before transitioning to the performing arts, graduating with a degree in theatre. He later graduated with a MFA from the American Repertory Theater's (A.R.T.) Institute for Advanced Theater Training at Harvard University.

Career
He made his film debut playing Nathoo in the Disney's 1994 live-action version of Rudyard Kipling's The Jungle Book. He has since appeared in such films as Picture Perfect (1997), Anywhere But Here (1999) and Charlie Wilson's War (2007). He also played the male lead in the 1999 independent film ABCD. 

In 2008, Tahir played the role of the villain Raza in the Marvel Comics-based Iron Man. 

He played Starfleet Captain Richard Robau in the 2009 film Star Trek. In 2013, Tahir played President Patel in the science-fiction film Elysium.

Tahir has guest starred on many television series, including Alias, The Practice, Family Law, The Agency, NYPD Blue, Lost, 7th Heaven, The West Wing, Walker, Texas Ranger, The D.A., 24, Monk, Justice, Cold Case, Chuck, Hawaii Five-0 and Warehouse 13. He also co-starred with Robert Beltran and Chase Masterson in the 2005 Sci-Fi Channel original movie Manticore. He also starred in the medical drama series Grey's Anatomy as Isaac and appeared on the CW series Supernatural as the Egyptian god Osiris in the seventh season's episode "Defending Your Life". Tahir starred in the ghost horror film Jinn. The role of Frank, Cliff Barnes' right-hand man in the reboot of Dallas. In 2015 Tahir appeared in a recurring role as the Commander on Supergirl.

He appeared in JAG in the episodes "Ice Queen" and "Meltdown" which served as the two pilot episodes for the series NCIS. Seven years later, Tahir appeared in the spin-off NCIS: Los Angeles.

In 2016 Tahir joined American Crime as Rhys Bashir, and was cast as Captain Nemo on Once Upon a Time. In 2017, Tahir played the role of Mallick in Syfy's TV show, 12 Monkeys..

On his visit to Karachi, Pakistan, he appeared in a web series Speak Your Heart With Samina Peerzada in January 2019.

Faran will be seen in the upcoming Pakistani movie Umro Ayyar- A New Beginning, an action thriller movie produced by Azfar Jafri under the banner of VR Chili Production. Umro Ayyar- A New Beginning is expected to be released in 2022 worldwide.

Filmography

Film

Television

Video games

References

External links 

 
 

1963 births
Living people

Male actors from Los Angeles

American expatriates in Pakistan
American male film actors
American male television actors
Institute for Advanced Theater Training, Harvard University alumni
University of California, Berkeley alumni
20th-century American male actors
21st-century American male actors
American male soap opera actors
American film actors of Pakistani descent